The Free Thai Movement was a Thai underground resistance movement against Imperial Japan during World War II. Seri Thai were an important source of military intelligence for the Allies in the region.

Background

In the aftermath of the Japanese invasion of Thailand on 7–8 December 1941, the regime of Plaek Phibunsongkhram (Phibun) declared war on the United Kingdom and the United States on 25 January 1942. Seni Pramoj, the Thai ambassador in Washington, refused to deliver the declaration to the United States government.

Accordingly, the United States refrained from declaring war on Thailand. Seni, a conservative aristocrat whose anti-Japanese credentials were well established, organized the Free Thai Movement with American assistance, recruiting Thai students in the United States to work with the United States Office of Strategic Services (OSS). The OSS trained Thai personnel for underground activities, and units were readied to infiltrate Thailand. By the end of the war, more than 50,000 Thais had been trained and armed to resist the Japanese by Free Thai members who had been parachuted into the country.

World War II and Japanese occupation

Phibun's alliance with Japan during the early years of war was initially popular. The Royal Thai Army joined Japan's Burma campaign with the goal of recovering their historical claims to part of the Shan states, previously surrendered to the Burmese Empire in the Burmese–Siamese wars and subsequently annexed by the British following the Third Anglo-Burmese War. They gained the return of the four northernmost Malay states lost in the Anglo-Siamese Treaty of 1909, and with Japanese mediation in the Franco–Thai war they also recovered territory lost in the Franco-Siamese War of 1893. 

However, Japan had stationed 150,000 troops on Thai soil, and as the war dragged on, the Japanese increasingly treated Thailand as a conquered country rather than an ally. Although the United States had not officially declared war, on 26 December 1942, US Tenth Army Air Force bombers based in India launched the first major bombing raid, which damaged targets in Bangkok and elsewhere and caused several thousand casualties. Public opinion, and even more importantly the sympathies of the civilian political elite, moved perceptibly against Phibun's alliance with Japan.

The Free Thai Movement was supported by British Force 136 and the American OSS - both provided valuable intelligence from within Thailand.

Pridi and the civilian regime, 1944–1947

In June 1944, Phibun was forced out of office and replaced by the first predominantly civilian government since the 1932 coup. Allied bombing raids continued, and a B-29 raid on Bangkok destroyed the two key power plants on 14 April 1945, leaving the city without power and water. Throughout the bombing campaign, the Seri Thai network was effective in broadcasting weather reports to the Allied air forces and in rescuing downed Allied airmen. The new government was headed by Khuang Aphaiwong, a civilian linked politically with conservatives such as Seni. The most influential figure in the regime, however, was Pridi Banomyong (who was serving as Regent of Thailand), whose anti-Japanese views were increasingly attractive to the Thais. In the last year of the war, Allied agents were tacitly given free access by Bangkok. As the war came to an end, Thailand repudiated its wartime agreements with Japan.

Unfortunately, the civilian leaders were unable to achieve unity. After falling-out with Pridi, Khuang was replaced as prime minister by the Regent's nominee, Seni, who had returned to Thailand from his post as leader of the Free Thai movement in Washington. The scramble for power among factions in late 1945 created political divisions among the civilian leaders that destroyed their potential for making a common stand against the resurgent political force of the Thai military in the immediate postwar years.

Postwar accommodations with the Allies also weakened the civilian government. As a result of the contributions made to the Allied war efforts by the Free Thai Movement, the United States, which unlike other Allied countries had never officially been at war with Thailand, refrained from dealing with Thailand as an enemy country in postwar peace negotiations. Before signing a peace treaty, however, the United Kingdom demanded war reparations in the form of rice shipments to Malaya, and France refused to permit admission of Thailand to the United Nations (UN) until the Indochinese areas regained by the Thais during the war were returned to France. The Soviet Union insisted on the repeal of Thailand's anti-communist legislation.

Heritage

Sakon Nakhon historical attractions include a cave well camouflaged by lush vegetation called Tham Seree Thai (ถ้ำเสรีไทย "Seri Thai Cave"), that was used for storage of arms and food during World War II.

List of famous Free Thai members

 Queen Rambai Barni, widow of King Prajadhipok and nominal head of the Seri Thai in the United Kingdom

 Prince Suphasawatwongsanit Sawatdiwat, Queen Rambai Barni's brother, a former Royal Thai Army officer

 Luang Bannakornkowit, Cabinet Member

 Thawi Bunyaket, Prime Minister of Thailand 1945
 Direk Jayanama, one time Minister of Finance and Foreign Affairs

 Air Marshal Dawee Chullasapya

 Mom Rajawongse Seni Pramoj, Prime Minister of Thailand 1945–46, 1975, 1976
 Pridi Banomyong, Prime Minister of Thailand 1946

 Siddhi Savetsila, later Air Chief Marshal of the Royal Thai Air Force, Foreign Minister of Thailand, Deputy Prime Minister of Thailand, and Privy Councillor to King Bhumibol Adulyadej 
 Tiang Sirikhanth, Assemblyman

 Sanguan Tularaksa, Cabinet Member

 Puey Ungpakorn, London-educated economist who headed the Bank of Thailand and later served as rector of Thammasat University

 Prince Varananda Dhavaj

 

 Phra Bisal Sukhumvit, first Thai MIT graduate, fifth chief of the Department of Highways

See also 

 Lao Issara and Khmer Serei, similar movements in Laos and Cambodia
 Jim Thompson and his activities in World War II

References

Further reading

 Thailand's Secret War: OSS, SOE and the Free Thai Underground During World War II. E. Bruce Reynolds. Cambridge Military Histories series. Cambridge University Press. . Colonel David Smiley is pictured page 377 with his Force 136 team.
 The Thai Resistance Movement During the Second World War, John B. Haseman, Northern Illinois Center for Southeast Asian Studies, np, 1978.
 Free Thai, compiled by Wimon Wiriyawit, White Lotus Co., Ltd, Bangkok, 1997.
 Into Siam, Underground Kingdom, Nicol Smith and Blake Clark, Bobbs Merrill Company, New York, 1945.
 Colonel David Smiley, Irregular Regular, Michael Russell, Norwich, 1994,. Translated in French by Thierry Le Breton, Au coeur de l'action clandestine des commandos au MI6, L'Esprit du Livre Editions, France, 2008,.  With numerous photographs.

External links
 Remarks of the Director of Central Intelligence George J. Tenet Honoring The Free Thai Movement, U.S. Central Intelligence Agency, 8 May 2000
 The Free Thai
 Seri Thai Park in Bangkok

Rebel groups in Thailand
Groups of World War II
National liberation armies
South-East Asian theatre of World War II
World War II resistance movements
Military history of Thailand during World War II
Japan–Thailand relations